Tunisia is competing at the 2013 Mediterranean Games in Mersin, Turkey from the 20th to 30 June 2013.

Basketball

Men's tournament

Team

Omar Mouhli
Mokhtar Mohamed Ghayaza
Makrem Ben Romdhane
Amine Rzig
Youssef Gaddour
Salah Mejri
Radhouane Slimane
Omar Abada
Nizar Knioua
Mourad El Mabrouk
Marouan Kechrid
Zied Chennoufi

Standings

Results

Football

Men's tournament

Team

Seifedine Lahwel
Rami Haj Selem
Khalim Sassi
Walid Dhaouedi
Idriss Mhirsi
Radhouene Khalfaoui
Rafik Kamarji
Adem Rjaibi
Mehdi Ben Nsib
Bechir Kablouti
Ayoub Jirtila
Sedik Mejri
Oualid Bouzidi
Zied Ounali
Slimen Kchok
Ahmed Khlil
Achref Mnani
Azer Ghali

Standings

Results

Handball 

Men's Tournament - 1 team of 16 athletes

Team

Mohamed Tajouri
Wassim Helal
Marouan Chouiref
Jihed Jaballah
Kamel Alouini
Abdelhak Ben Salah
Selim Hedoui
Mohamed Souissi
Mosbah Sanai
Wael Jallouz
Mohamed Ali Bhar
Aymen Toumi
Aymen Hammed
Oussama Boughanmi
Amine Bannour

Women's Tournament - 1 team of 16 athletes

Sailing 

Men

Volleyball

Men's tournament

Team

Saddem Hmissi
Anouer Taouerghi
Samir Sellami
Marouene M'rabet
Ahmed Kadhi
Bilel Ben Hassine
Hakim Zouari
Elyes Karamosly
Marouen Garci
Hamza Nagga
Ismail Moalla
Amen Allah Hmissi

Standings

Results

References

Nations at the 2013 Mediterranean Games
2013
Mediterranean Games